Constantin Pristaviță-Mardare (born 23 May 1993) is a Romanian rugby union player. He plays in the prop position for amateur SuperLiga club Baia Mare and București based European Challenge Cup side the Wolves. Pristaviță also plays for Romania's national team the Oaks.

Pristaviță made his international debut in 2013 in the prop position against Russia. He played for Romania in the IRB Nations Cup and in their 2015 Rugby World Cup qualifying before appearing for them in their 2013 end of year tour.

References

External links

 
 
 
 

1993 births
Romanian rugby union players
Romania international rugby union players
Rugby union props
Living people
București Wolves players
CSM Știința Baia Mare players